Amburdərə or Ambudərə or Amburdara may refer to:
Aşağı Amburdərə, Azerbaijan
Yuxarı Amburdərə, Azerbaijan